3 Days to Kill is a 2014 action thriller film directed by McG and written by Luc Besson and Adi Hasak. It stars Kevin Costner, Amber Heard, Hailee Steinfeld, Connie Nielsen, Richard Sammel, and Eriq Ebouaney. It was released on 21 February 2014, received mixed reviews, and grossed $52.6 million against its $28 million budget.

Plot
American CIA agent Ethan Renner works with a team to capture the Albino, the lieutenant to an arms trafficker (called the Wolf) who is selling a dirty bomb to terrorists in a hotel in Belgrade. The Albino deduces the trap when he recognizes one of Renner's fellow agents (disguised as a chambermaid), whom he kills. Renner, suddenly dizzy as he pursues The Albino, only manages to cripple him by shooting him in the leg, then blacks out, allowing the Albino to escape. Meanwhile, elite CIA assassin Vivi Delay, a "Top Shelf agent", has been personally assigned by the Director to kill the Wolf. Vivi monitors the operation and suspects Renner has unknowingly seen the Wolf.

Renner is nearly disabled by an extreme cough, which is diagnosed as terminal glioblastoma cancer that has spread to his lungs. He is only given a few months to live and won't live to see the following Christmas. For decades he has kept his dangerous career a carefully guarded secret from his wife Christine and daughter Zooey, at the cost of losing them. He decides to spend his remaining time trying to fix his relationship with his estranged daughter, and if possible, his ex-wife. He returns to Paris, where he and his family live separately, to find the Réunion family of Jules is squatting in his apartment. He is told by the police that he is not permitted to evict indigent squatters until after the winter. He makes an awkward reconnection with Christine, and tells her of his terminal illness. She allows him to reconnect with Zooey, and when she has to go out of the country on business, she agrees to let him look after Zooey.

Vivi recruits him to find and kill the Wolf, in exchange for an experimental drug that could extend his life significantly. Renner reluctantly accepts, to get more time with his family. Vivi tells him the way to trap the Wolf is by getting the Albino, in turn by getting his accountant, in turn by kidnapping the gang's limousine driver. All the while Renner is fighting the hallucinogenic effect of the medicine, which occurs whenever his heart rate goes too high, and which he can only control by consuming alcohol. He must also deal with Zooey's school problems, including her habit of lying so she can sneak out partying. He manages to keep her out of trouble, and slowly reestablishes a father relationship with her, which impresses his wife.

He tracks the Wolf and the Albino into the subway, but they gain the upper hand when he is disabled by the hallucinations. The Albino attempts to kill him by pushing him in front of an oncoming train, but Renner manages to push the Albino on the track instead. The Wolf escapes, then contacts a business partner who can help him to flee the country.

The family is invited to a party thrown by Zooey's boyfriend's father, who happens to be the Wolf's business partner. Renner manages to protect Christine and Zooey, kill all the Wolf's men, and trap the Wolf in an elevator before breaking the cables, causing the cabin to free-fall to the ground. The Wolf survives, severely injured, but Renner is again disabled and, also feeling guilty for all the damage his work has done to his family, he's suddenly unable to pull the trigger, and drops his gun where the Wolf can get it. Vivi intervenes and kicks the gun back to Renner, telling him to finish the job and kill the Wolf, but he decides not to, because "I promised my wife I'd quit." Vivi then kills the Wolf.

At last retired, Renner survives to Christmas, which he is spending at a beach house with Zooey and Christine. He discovers a small, red wrapped gift package, which contains another vial of the cancer medicine. Vivi is seen on a hill behind the house smiling as Renner opens the package.

Cast
 Kevin Costner as Ethan Renner
 Amber Heard as Vivi Delay, one of the CIA's elite assassins
 Hailee Steinfeld as Zooey Renner, Ethan's estranged sixteen-year-old daughter
 Connie Nielsen as Christine Renner, Ethan's ex-wife
 Richard Sammel as the Wolf, German arms trafficker
 Marc Andréoni as Mitat Yilmaz
 Eriq Ebouaney as Jules, a Réunion man whose family squats in Ethan's apartment
 Tómas Lemarquis as the Albino, the Wolf's lieutenant
 Raymond J. Barry as the CIA Director
 Jonathan Barbezieux as Louis
 Jonas Bloquet as Hugh, Zooey's boyfriend
 Rupert Wynne-James as Hugh's father, who happens to be the Wolf's partner

Production
On 7 August 2012, Deadline reported that Kevin Costner had been offered the role of Ethan Renner, a government assassin in the McG-directed film. The film, set in France, was scripted by Luc Besson and Adi Hasak, with EuropaCorp having produced while Relativity Media has North American rights. On 2 October 2012, it was confirmed that actor Costner had closed the deal to star as lead in the film. On 29 November 2012, Hailee Steinfeld joined the cast of the film as the female lead, and the film began production in early 2013. On 13 December, Amber Heard also joined the cast. Later, on 7 January 2013, Connie Nielsen was added to the cast.

Filming
On 7 January 2013, crews were filming scenes in Paris and Belgrade, and shooting wrapped in April. Some scenes in Paris were filmed in the studios and in the central nave of the Cité du Cinéma, founded by Luc Besson in Saint-Denis. Scenes in Belgrade were filmed in front of Hotel Jugoslavija.

Release
On 31 January 2013, photos from the set of the film were released. In November 2013, stills from the film were released. On 17 December 2013, the studio released the first trailer and the poster for the film. On 30 January 2014, Relativity released a new Super Bowl 2014 spot.

On 28 May 2013, Relativity set a release date of 14 February 2014 for the film. Later, on 30 October, the film's date was shifted back a week, to 21 February 2014.

Box office
3 Days to Kill grossed $12,242,218 in its opening weekend across 2872 theaters, finishing in second place behind The Lego Movie ($31.3 million). The film grossed a domestic total of $30,697,999 and an international total of $22,562,231, bringing its total gross to $53,260,230.

Critical response
3 Days to Kill holds a 27% approval rating on Rotten Tomatoes, based on 124 reviews with an average rating of 4.6/10. The site's consensus states: "3 Days to Kill uneasily mixes technically accomplished action sequences with an underdeveloped family conflict." On Metacritic, the film has a score of 40 out of 100, based on 30 critics, indicating "mixed or average reviews" from critics. Audiences surveyed by CinemaScore gave the film a grade B on scale of A to F.

Geoff Berkshire of Variety wrote: "The lukewarm family dynamics sit awkwardly alongside equally underwhelming action sequences."

Mark Kermode in The Guardian gave the film one star out of five, describing it as "pitiful".

References

External links

 
 
 
 

2010s American films
2010s French films
2014 films
2014 action thriller films
French action thriller films
American action thriller films
English-language French films
Films about cancer
Films about the Central Intelligence Agency
Films about terrorism in Europe
Squatting in film
Films directed by McG
Films produced by Luc Besson
Films set in Paris
Films set in France
Films set in Serbia
Films set in Belgrade
Films shot in Paris
Films shot in Serbia
Films shot in Belgrade
Wonderland Sound and Vision films
EuropaCorp films
Relativity Media films